Reginald Patrick MacGillicuddy (24 July 1891 – 26 January 1922) was an Australian rules footballer who played with University in the Victorian Football League in 1911.

Reg MacGillicuddy was the son of Irish-catholic parents, Dr Daniel Florance MacGillicuddy and Mary Anne Meaney, who lived in Richmond, in Melbourne's inner east. He attended Xavier College where he excelled at rowing, cricket and football. He studied medicine at the University of Melbourne and while in his first year he made two VFL appearances with the University team.

He enlisted in World War I and served as captain in the AAMC Hospital Transport Corps at Suez Canal in 1917–18 but was discharged due to chronic cough. Upon his return from war he married stage performer Goodie Reeve and moved to Brisbane, but died in 1922, aged 30.

References

External links

1891 births
1922 deaths
People educated at Xavier College
University Football Club players
Australian rules footballers from Victoria (Australia)